Sri Aurobindo International School, Hyderabad is a school located in Hyderabad, Telangana. The school is named in honor of philosopher Sri Aurobindo.

Prefectorial system
Each year, a centralized prefectorial body is set up to ensure proper functioning of the school body. The board consists of the School President and School Captain, with a deputy Vice-Captain to assist. They lead a group of prefects, including high post holders like the school sports secretaries, the house captains and captains of other activities, along with the other prefects. The students of class 10 hold the majority of the posts. 

All posts except for the post of the school captain and the school president are elected directly by high school students. Together, the post holders make up the Students' Council.

The school has four houses or sub-groups: Perfection (white), Power (red), Harmony (pink), and Wisdom (yellow). Students are divided into these houses and participate in Inter House competitions.

Facilities
The total area of the school is 15000 sq. m. The school has two blocks: the Primary school block, and the High school block. Together these also house the following: the principal's and vice-principal's offices, staff room, assembly courtyard and classrooms, as well as laboratories for computer science and the natural sciences.

Extracurricular Activities
Students have vast options of extracurricular activities to choose from, such as music (vocal and instrumental), dance, theatre, arts, craft, home science, fashion designing, pottery, and various languages, including German, French and Sanskrit. Basketball, chess, swimming, tennis, karate, and badminton are offered as after-school activities.

The school has a basketball team actively takes part in ICSE meets and other interschool competitions.

See also
Auroville
Integral education
Mirra Alfassa "The Mother"
Sri Aurobindo
Sri Aurobindo Ashram
The Mother's International School

References

External links
 Sri Aurobindo International School, Hyderabad
 Institute of Human Study, Hyderabad

Schools in Hyderabad, India
Schools affiliated with the Sri Aurobindo Ashram
Educational institutions in India with year of establishment missing